Brian James may refer to:
Brian James (soccer) (born 1993), American soccer player
Brian James (guitarist) (born 1955), British former guitarist of punk band the Damned
Brian Girard James, better known as Road Dogg (born 1969), American professional wrestler
Brian James (rugby league) (1943–2020), Australian rugby league footballer
Brian James (actor) (1918–2009), Australian actor
Brian James (basketball) (born 1956), American basketball coach
Brian James (cricketer, born 1934) (1934–2000), English cricketer
Brian James (cricketer, born 1941) (1941–2002), English cricketer
Brian James (cricketer, born 1982), Zimbabwean cricketer
Brian d'Arcy James (born 1968), American actor and musician
Brian R. James (born 1974), American game designer and software engineer
Brian James (priest) (1930–2013), Church in Wales priest

See also
Brion James (1945–1999), American actor